Rhododendron vernicosum (亮叶杜鹃) is a rhododendron species native to  western Sichuan, southeastern Xizang, and western Yunnan, China, where it grows at altitudes of . The flowers are somewhat fragrant, and pale pink or white.

Synonyms
 Rhododendron adoxum Balf.f. & Forrest
 Rhododendron araliiforme Balf.f. & Forrest
 Rhododendron euanthum Balf.f. & W.W.Sm.
 Rhododendron hexamerum Hand.-Mazz.
 Rhododendron rhantum Balf.f. & W.W.Sm.
 Rhododendron sheltoniae Hemsl. & E.H. Wilson

References
 Franchet, J. Bot. (Morot). 12: 258. 1898.

vernicosum